Kimberley Jim is a soundtrack album recorded by Jim Reeves for the 1964 motion picture Kimberley Jim, in which he starred. The album was released by RCA Victor.

Track listing

References 

1964 soundtrack albums
Jim Reeves albums
RCA Victor soundtracks